Alessandro Franchi may refer to:
 Alessandro Franchi (cardinal) (1819–1878),  Italian cardinal and archbishop
 Alessandro Franchi (painter) (1838–1914), Italian painter